Louis Bailey Lowdermilk (February 23, 1887 – December 27, 1975), was an American politician and a Major League Baseball pitcher who played in  and  with the St. Louis Cardinals. Lowdermilk had a 4–5 record with a 3.38 ERA, in 20 career games, in his two-year career. He was born in Sandborn, Indiana, and died in Centralia, Illinois. He was the brother of Grover Lowdermilk, who also played in Major League Baseball.

Political career
Lowdermilk served as mayor of Odin, Illinois.

Notes

External links

1887 births
1975 deaths
American athlete-politicians
People from Marion County, Illinois
People from Knox County, Indiana
Mayors of places in Illinois
Major League Baseball pitchers
Baseball players from Indiana
St. Louis Cardinals players
Mobile Sea Gulls players
20th-century American politicians
Freeport Pretzels players
Shelbyville Queen Citys players